The list of ship commissionings in 1999 includes a chronological list of all ships commissioned in 1999.


See also 

1999